John Grobham Howe (1625–1679) of Langar Hall, Nottinghamshire, was an English politician who sat in the House of Commons between 1659 and 1679.

Howe was the younger son of Sir John Howe, 1st Baronet, and his wife Bridget Rich, daughter of Thomas Rich of North Cerney. He was a student of Lincoln's Inn in 1645. 

In 1659, Howe was elected Member of Parliament for Gloucestershire in the Third Protectorate Parliament.  He was re-elected MP for Gloucestershire in 1661 for the Cavalier Parliament and sat until 1679.   
 
Howe died at the age of about 54 and was buried at Langar on 27 May 1679.

Howe married  Annabella, the illegitimate daughter of Emanuel Scrope, 1st Earl of Sunderland, and Martha Jones, who became co-heiress of her father's estate and brought the manor of Langar, Nottinghamshire, to her husband. In 1663, King Charles granted her the precedence of an Earl's legitimate daughter and she became Lady Annabelle Howe. There were four sons, Scrope Howe, 1st Viscount Howe, John Grubham Howe (MP for Gloucestershire), Charles Howe, Emanuel Scrope Howe and five daughters.

References

1625 births
1679 deaths
John
Members of Lincoln's Inn
Politicians from Gloucestershire
English MPs 1659
English MPs 1661–1679
Younger sons of baronets